Tenuiballus is a small genus of southern African jumping spiders. It was first described by G. N. Azarkina and C. R. Haddad in 2020, and it has only been found in South Africa.  it contains only two species: T. coronatus and T. minor.

See also
 List of Salticidae genera

References

Salticidae genera
Spiders of South Africa